Behram Khan [also spelt Bairam Khan] is a Bollywood film. It was released in 1946.

Details
The story of the movie, about the Mughal army commander Bairam Khan, was written by famed poet and writer Hakim Ahmad Shuja, assisted by Kamal Amrohi, and was directed by Gajanan Jagirdar, who also starred in it. The music was composed by Ghulam Haider. Other main cast members included Mehtab, Lalita Pawar, Yusuf Effendi, Sunalini Devi and Suresh.

References

External links
 

1946 films
1940s Hindi-language films
Indian black-and-white films
Films directed by Gajanan Jagirdar
Indian biographical drama films
Indian historical drama films
Films set in the Mughal Empire